The Israel Premier Lacrosse League (IPLL) is the premier lacrosse league in Israel, which debuted in 2015. The league competes during summer months only, in an attempt to attract players from abroad to participate. The IPLL says they learned their lessons from the Israel Baseball League, and are running it in a manor that will enable them to be financially stable.

Teams
The IPLL had four teams in the 2015 season before expanding to six in 2016, which were:

Stadiums
There are six stadiums used by the IPLL which are:

League championships

2015 season

The 2015 season was the inaugural season of the IPLL. Barak Netanya LC won the IPLL Championship with a win over Haifa LC, with Bryan Hopper winning the EL AL Player of the Game award. A total of 16 games were played, with each team playing eight games.

Standings

Source:

2016 season

The 2016 season of the IPLL was their second season. Tel Aviv LC decided to suspend operations for the 2016 season, however Ashdod LC, Kiryat Gat LC, and Be'er Sheva LC joined the league for the 2016 season. A total of 22 games were played, with each team playing either seven or eight games. Be'er Sheva defeated Haifa in the finals 11:10 for the championship.

Standings

Source:

References

Lacrosse in Israel
2014 establishments in Israel
Sports leagues established in 2014